Davide Falcioni (born May 19, 1975 in Fano) is a retired Italian professional football player.

Honours
 Serie A champion: 1996/97.

1975 births
Living people
Italian footballers
Association football goalkeepers
Serie A players
Alma Juventus Fano 1906 players
Olbia Calcio 1905 players
Juventus F.C. players
Treviso F.B.C. 1993 players
L.R. Vicenza players
U.S. Livorno 1915 players
Cosenza Calcio 1914 players
Catania S.S.D. players
Vis Pesaro dal 1898 players